The 1946 Badger State Conference football season was the season of college football played by the member schools of the Badger State Conference (BSC) as part of the 1946 college football season. Northwestern College of Watertown, Wisconsin, led by head coach Leonard J. Umnus, compiled a 3–2–1 record and won the BSC championship.

Conference overview

Teams

Northwestern College
The 1946 Northwestern College football team represented Northwestern College in the Badger State Conference (BSC) during the 1946 college football season. Led by head coach Leonard J. Umnus, Northwestern compiled a 3–2–1 record (2–0–1 against BSC opponents), won the BSC championship, and outscored opponents by a total of 57 to 44.

Wisconsin Tech
The 1946 Wisconsin Tech football team represented the Wisconsin Institute of Technology in the Badger State Conference (BSC) during the 1946 college football season. Led by head coach George R. Dobson, Wisconsin Tech compiled a 2–1 record, finished second in the BSC, and outscored opponents by a total of 33 to 13.

Mission House
The 1946 Mission House Muskies football team represented Mission House College in the Badger State Conference (BSC) during the 1946 college football season. Led by head coach Marinus Kregel, Mission House compiled a 3–3 record, finished third in the BSC, and outscored opponents by a total of 58 to 44.

Milton
The 1946 Milton Wildcats football team represented Milton College in the Badger State Conference (BSC) during the 1946 college football season. Led by head coach Elmer R. Fenton, Milton compiled a 1–4–1 record, finished fourth in the BSC, and was outscored by a total of 65 to 28.

Wisconsin Extension
The 1946 Wisconsin Extension football team represented the University of Wisconsin–Extension of Milwaukee in the Badger State Conference (BSC) during the 1946 college football season. Led by head coach Traskell, the team compiled a 1–4–1 record, finished last in the BSC, and was outscored by a total of 72 to 36.

References

Badger State Conference